Argonon is an independent media group founded in 2011 by James Burstall, the CEO of Leopard Films. Argonon has offices in London, Los Angeles, New York, Liverpool, Oklahoma, and Glasgow. The group produces and distributes factual entertainment, documentary, reality, entertainment, arts, drama, and children's programming for various television networks and channels worldwide, although they focus on the UK, US, and Canadian markets. Argonon produces shows such as The Masked Singer UK (ITV), Worzel Gummidge (BBC One), Dispatches (Channel 4), Attenborough and the Mammoth Graveyard (BBC One), House Hunters International (HGTV) and Hard Cell (Netflix).

History
In 2017, Argonon invested in a joint venture—Bandicoot—in partnership with Derek McLean and Daniel Nettleton. In the same year Leopard Pictures invested in Kristian Smith, twice BAFTA winner, as Chief Creative Officer.

Argonon won the National Winner Award (UK) at the European Awards in 2018 and 2019. Argonon has won 130 awards including Emmys, BAFTAs, and RTS Awards, and received over 200 nominations.

In 2020, Argonon acquired branded video agency, Nemorin Film & Video, bringing Nemorin's CEO Pete Fergusson into the group.

In 2021, Argonon launched a factual formats-focused production company, Studio Leo, with Claire Collinson-Jones becoming Chief Creative Officer of the firm.

In 2022, Argonon partnered with Joe Weinstock to launch a new production company, Rose Rock Entertainment.

The group saw a turnover of £55.6m in 2021. Argonon was listed in the London Stock Exchange "1000 Companies To Inspire Britain 2016" report and the 2017 report. Argonon was also listed in the 2016 Sunday Times HSBC Track 200.

Companies (current)

Bandicoot TV 
Bandicoot TV (sometimes credited as Bandicoot Scotland) was founded in 2017 by Derek McLean and Daniel Nettleton as a joint venture with Argonon. Productions include Chase The Case for BBC1, Test Drive for BBC Scotland and ITV's versions of The Masked Singer and spin-off The Masked Dancer.

The Masked Singer is a singing competition based on the Masked Singer franchise and is an ongoing production for Bandicoot. It is directed by Casey Antwis and Simon Staffurth, with Jonathan Ross, Davina McCall, Ken Jeong, and Rita Ora as panellists. In series two, Jeong was replaced by Mo Gilligan. The spin-off series, The Masked Dancer, featured Jonathan Ross, Davina McCall, Mo Gilligan and Oti Mabuse as panellists. Joel Dommett has hosted all series of The Masked Singer and The Masked Dancer.

The Masked Singer won a Royal Television Society Programme Award 2021 in the Entertainment category and an International Emmy Award 2021 in the Non-Scripted Entertainment category.

The Masked Singer Live! tour version of the show was announced by Joel Dommett in an appearance on The One Show in December 2021. The Masked Singer Live!  toured the UK throughout 2022. The third series of The Masked Singer premiered on ITV on January 1, 2022.

In February 2022, it was announced that The Masked Singer had been recommissioned by ITV for two further seasons. The fourth series of The Masked Singer will premiere on January 1, 2023.

Bandicoot was also behind Peckham's Finest for ITV2. This was an observational documentary series following a diverse group of young people from the area of Peckham, London.

BriteSpark Films
BriteSpark Films (also credited as BrightSpark East) launched as a co-venture between documentary film-maker Nick Godwin and the Argonon group in 2013. In 2018, Argonon acquired full ownership of the company, with Godwin staying on as Creative Director. The company produces factual, features, documentary and drama-documentary programming for the international market and has worked with ITV, Channel 5, Channel 4, Shaw Media, Discovery International, and Discovery ID.

Productions include long-running Channel 5 series Nightmare Tenants, Slum Landlords which focuses on conflicts between landlords and tenants; a portrait of London's jewellers working in the Hatton Garden district called Diamond Geezers and Gold Dealers (for ITV); a programme for Channel 4 called Manchester's Serial Killer? which investigates a spate of suspicious deaths in Manchester's canals; a drama-documentary series for Investigation Discovery called The Wives Did It which profiles murder cases involving polygamy. BriteSpark also produces Incredible Engineering Blunders: Fixed for Discovery International and a madcap, gross-out, comedy game show called What The Yuck?! with Geordie Shore star Nathan Henry.

BriteSpark also produced the Bill Nighy narrated Channel 5 travel documentaries World's Most Scenic Railway Journeys and World's Most Scenic River Journeys, with the latter series co-produced with the Blue Ant-owned Saloon Media in Canada.

BriteSpark also produced several episodes for Channel 4's current affairs strand Dispatches, including Royals for Hire, Deep Fakes: Can You Trust Your Eyes?, Coronavirus: How Britain is Changing, The Prince and the Paedophile and The Truth About Electric Cars.

Leopard Pictures 
Leopard Pictures was launched in 2017 from the previously titled Leopard Drama. Kristian Smith was appointed Chief Creative Officer.

Their most recent shows were Worzel Gummidge, a two-part children's drama series which aired on BBC1 starring Mackenzie Crook, the animated Mimi And The Mountain Dragon, and The Snow Spider (CBBC & BBC One Wales).

Crook features in the titular role in Worzel Gummidge, while also writing and directing the series. The miniseries is an adaptation of Barbara Euphan Todd's series of books in which the character Worzel Gummidge, a magical scarecrow, appears. Two one-hour specials aired in December 2019, titled The Scarecrow of Scatterbrook and The Green Man. The third one-hour special, titled Saucy Nancy, aired in December 2020. Saucy Nancy won an RTS Craft & Design Award in 2021 in the Sound – Drama category.

In November 2021, a Bonfire Night special of Worzel Gummidge titled Guy Forks, aired. Two further one-hour Worzel Gummidge specials aired on BBC One in December 2021, titled Twitchers and Calliope Jane.

Leopard Pictures' latest production, Hard Cell, starring Catherine Tate was released on Netflix in April 2022.

Leopard USA
Leopard USA creates reality, lifestyle, and entertainment programming. From its office in New York City, Leopard USA produces hundreds of hours of programming yearly for television and digital distribution for channels including Facebook, HGTV, DIY, GSN, A&E, TruTV, Speedvision, Discovery, TLC, BBC America, and CNBC. Leopard USA was founded in 2002 and became part of the Argonon group in 2011.

The first programme produced by Leopard USA was Cash in the Attic USA for HGTV.

Leopard USA programming includes HGTV's House Hunters International, with over 2000 episodes and 160 series completed to date. The programme brand has extended to further shows including House Hunters Off the Grid and House Hunters International: The Adventure Continues. House Hunters International won a Critics Choice Real TV Award 2021 for Best Lifestyle: Home/Garden Show.

Man Caves is a long-running home renovation reality show which was first produced by Leopard USA in 2007 and is presented by former Super Bowl winner Tony Siragusa for cable channel DIY. Dear Genevieve, featuring designer and presenter Genevieve Gorder, launched on HGTV in 2009, and each episode sees Gorder design a room or an area for a family after they have written to the show asking for help.

Other programming highlights include Food Network's Restaurant Divided and CNBC's The Filthy Rich Guide. Programmes for A&E include Missing Las Vegas, Disaster Guy, and Ransom Squad.

In 2019, a multi-part series called Mormon Love was aired on Facebook Watch. It was produced by James Burstall, Rick de Oliveira, and Jillian Brand.

In 2021, six episodes of the US revival of Cash in the Attic, hosted by Courtney Tezeno, aired on HGTV and was later available to stream on Discovery+. The series is executive produced by Leopard USA's Chief Creative Officer, Lindsay Schwartz, and Argonon CEO James Burstall.

Like a Shot Entertainment
In 2018, Argonon bought Like a Shot Entertainment. The company invests in history and factual science programming and is involved in rights management. Henry Scott and Steve Gillham are the directors of the company, who co-founded the company in 2011.

The company handles production of shows such as UKTV-Yesterday's/Science Channel's Abandoned Engineering, Forbidden History and Smoke & Steel.

Like A Shot's latest production, Black Panthers of WWII aired on UKTV-Yesterday channel in October 2021 as part of Black History Month. The one-off documentary special tells the story of a tank battalion composed of African-American service members, the first US armoured unit of its kind to enter combat.

In September 2022, Like A Shot launched a 10 episode podcast series, Forbidden History.

Nemorin Film & Video 
In December 2020, Argonon acquired branded video agency, Nemorin Film & Video. Key people include Nemorin Founder and CEO Pete Fergusson.

Nemorin Film & Video has produced content for brands such as Hugo Boss, McDonald's, Amazon, American Express, Nat Geo, and NBC Universal.

Rose Rock Entertainment 
Rose Rock Entertainment launched in 2022 as a joint venture between Joe Weinstock and the Argonon Group. Rose Rock Entertainment launched with offices in Los Angeles and Oklahoma and will focus on delivering cinematic American factual content.

Studio Leo 
Studio Leo was launched by Argonon in early 2021 and is led by Claire Collinson-Jones. The company's first production was a three-part documentary series titled Inside Tesco 24/7 that aired on Channel 5 in June 2021. The docuseries explored the story of Britain's biggest retailer, Tesco.

Studio Leo produced the revived Cash in the Attic series for Channel 5, which returned for 40 x 60' episodes in 2022. The renewed series was hosted by Chris Kamara and co-hosted by the original series' host, Jules Hudson. Claire Collinson-Jones was the Executive Producer.

Windfall Films
Windfall Films is a BAFTA and Emmy award-winning independent production company. Founded in 1988 by David Dugan, Ian Duncan, and Oliver Morse, it became part of the Argonon group in 2014.

The company produces factual and documentary programmes across various genres, including science, engineering, social, history, adventure, and natural history. The company produces programmes for international television networks including BBC, Channel 4, Channel 5, PBS, Discovery Channel, National Geographic Channel, and History Channel.

Highlights include Murder Trial for Channel 4 which won many documentary awards in 2014, including a BAFTA award for best Single Documentary, a Grierson award for Best Documentary on a Contemporary Theme, an RTS award for Best Single Documentary and a Broadcast Award for Best Single Documentary.

Your Inner Fish for PBS (produced in collaboration with Tangled Bank Studios) won two Wildscreen Panda Awards, two Jackson Hole Science Media awards, and an AAAS Kavli award.

The Batman of Mexico for BBC Natural World won a Wildscreen Panda Award and a New York Wild Film Festival award.

In 2009, Sons of Cuba, a feature documentary about an inspirational boxing academy in Havana and winner of Best Documentary at the Rome Film Festival and Best Newcomer Grierson Award.

Science and Natural History highlights include Inside Nature's Giants for Channel 4, which won a BAFTA for Best Specialist Factual; The Fifteen Billion Pound Railway about the Crossrail project in London for BBC 2; Strip the Cosmos for Discovery's Science Channel; Born in the Wild and Operation Maneater for Channel 4; Spider House for BBC Four; The Raising of the Costa Concordia for NGCI and PBS NOVA; Race & Intelligence: Science's Last Taboo, an investigation by Rageh Omaar which launched a Channel 4 season on race.

Additional notable science highlights include Inside Einstein's Mind for BBC Four, Einstein's Quantum Riddle for PBS, Saving Planet Earth: Fixing a Hole for Channel 4, which won Best Science Film at Green Screen 2019, and How to See a Black Hole: The Universe's Greatest Mystery for BBC Four, which captured the first-ever image of a black hole and won a Gold Award at the 2020 New York Festivals TV and Film Awards in the Science & Technology category.

Windfall also produced the Emmy award-winning series DNA for PBS and Channel 4 celebrating the 50th anniversary of the double helix for Channel 4 and PBS; Absolute Zero was a series about the science of extreme cold for PBS and BBC 4; Wanted: Butch Cassidy and The Sundance Kid was produced for C4 True Stories and PBS NOVA and Reality On The Rocks was a Channel 4 series that follows Ken Campbell trying to get to grips with A Brief History of Time.

Windfall Films has produced live multi-platform events for Channel Four, including D Day: As It Happens, winner of a Digital Emmy, a BAFTA craft innovation award and two Webby Awards; Easter Eggs Live; Foxes Live: Wild in the City; The Operation: Surgery Live, a week of live surgery.

Windfall has produced several historical documentaries, including Generals At War, a 'cardboard' battle strategy format for NGCI; Attack of the Zeppelins; and Dambusters: Building the Bouncing Bomb (for C4 and PBS NOVA); The Great Escape: Revealed for Channel 5 and PBS; Colditz; Men of Iron and Commando, all for Channel 4.

Windfall has also produced engineering formats illustrated with CGI, including  for Discovery's Science Channel;  for H2 and Discovery Canada; Big, Bigger, Biggest for Channel 5 and National Geographic Channel and five series of Monster Moves for Channel 5 and Discovery Channel. Other programmes include two factually-based dramas for Channel Four: Born with Two Mothers and Richard is My Boyfriend and award-winning observational documentaries for Channel 4, including The Decision and Fifteen for BBC.

Windfall has also produced adventure formats including The Tourist Trap spied on four different nationalities on holiday and Lost!, dropping three blindfolded groups of competitors anywhere in the world and then following their progress as they race home, and Mutiny for Channel 4, an experimental programme challenging modern men to relive the Mutiny on the Bounty of 1789.

Large returning formats produced by Windfall include: Strip the Cosmos for Discovery Science, Railroad Alaska for Discovery Channel, Unearthed for Discovery Channel, Lost Treasures of Egypt for Nat Geo, My Floating Home for More4, Europe From Above for Nat Geo, and the Royal Institution Christmas Lectures for BBC.

In 2021, Windfall produced the documentary, Jabbed! Inside Britain's Vaccine Triumph for Channel 4, telling the story of the government's Vaccine Taskforce – the team responsible for finding, funding and procuring Covid vaccines, specifically the Oxford-AstraZeneca vaccine. The documentary won a BAFTA Scotland award in the News & Current Affairs category.

Other notable productions include Attenborough, and the Mammoth Graveyard for BBC One, presented by Sir David Attenborough.

In January 2022, Windfall Films released their first feature length film, The Wall - Climb for Gold. The film followed the lives of four elite female climbers, Brooke Raboutou, Janja Garnbret, Miho Nonaka, and Shauna Coxsey, and their journey to Tokyo 2020 Olympics.

Windfall Films has been featured in Broadcast Magazine's top ten polls of independent production companies.

Companies (previous)

Leopard Drama (now Leopard Pictures)
Leopard Drama produced contemporary British drama and comedy for various broadcasters, including BBC, ITV, and CBBC, and co-produced theatrical cinema releases. Leopard Pictures was founded in 2005 and became part of the Argonon group in 2011.

The most recent series was Eve, a 13-part children's drama series which aired on CBBC in the UK, running for three series.

Previous TV drama includes An Englishman in New York starring John Hurt and Cynthia Nixon which aired on ITV and in several countries throughout the world. The film received several accolades including a 2009 Teddy Award at the Berlinale for Outstanding Performance by an Actor for John Hurt. Also in 2009, the film was Winner, Best Feature, at the Hamburg Lesbian and Gay Film Festival. The film was nominated for a Best Actor BAFTA for John Hurt in 2010 and nominated in two categories at the BAFTA TV Craft Awards in 2010 with Joey Attawia nominated for Best Costume Design and Beth Mickle for Best Production Design. The filmed received a Royal Television Society Craft and Design Awards nomination for Joey Attawia in 2010, and was a nominee at the Rose D'Or Global Television Festival for Best Drama & Mini Series as well as a nominee at the Glaad Media Awards in 2010 in the category of Outstanding TV Movie or Mini Series.

Mysterious Creatures for ITV1 starring Brenda Blethyn and Timothy Spall was nominated for a Royal Television Society award for Sharon Martin in the category of Best Hair, and Makeup and was the winner of the Best Single & Serial Drama at the Mental Health Media Awards (sponsored by BAFTA) in 2007. Missing was a crime drama starring Pauline Quirke for BBC One, which ran for two series and was shortlisted for Best Drama Series at the Mental Health Awards in 2009.

The production company also produced a one-off comedy-drama, The Grey Man, based on a novel by Andy McNab, for BBC One and a 5-part series of comedy shorts, Conversations with my Wife for BBC Comedy starring Lenny Henry.

Leopard Pictures' first co-produced feature was The Holding, released in 2012, starring Vincent Regan. The film won an award at Fantasporto, the International Fantasy Film Awards in 2012 for Susan Jacobson in the category of Best Director and was nominated at the Chicago International Film Festival in 2011 in the After Dark Competition.

Leopard Films
Founded in 2001, Leopard Films was one of the first companies to join Argonon in 2011 and supplies programmes across the factual, factual entertainment, children's, and art genres for broadcasters across the UK including BBC, Channel 4, Channel 5 UK, and BSkyB.

The first show produced by the production company was Monstrous Bosses and How to Be One for BBC1. The second was Cash in the Attic for the BBC, which ran for ten years on the BBC and went on to transmit in 167 countries following its launch in 2002. The series was nominated for a Royal Television Society Programme Awards, 2008, for Best Daytime Programme in 2002. An offshoot series Celebrity Cash in the Attic was produced by Leopard Films and a website www.cashintheattic.com launched in 2013 in the UK and 2015 in the US, as a digital brand extension of the show.

Other programmes include The War on Britain's Roads for BBC One in 2014 which explored the tensions between cyclists and motorists on Britain's roads and was nominated for a Grierson Award for Best Documentary on a Contemporary Theme Leopard Films produced Tourette's: Let Me Entertain You for BBC Three where musicians with Tourette's Syndrome were given the chance to perform in front of a live audience.

Other commissions for Leopard included Street Patrol UK for BBC One, Britcam: Emergency on our Streets (Pick and Sky1), Snowtrapped for Channel 5 and Robbed, Raided, Reunited for BBC Two. Missing Live (BBC One) was nominated for a Royal Television Society award for Best Daytime programme in 2008 and won a CorpComms Award for Best Use of Broadcast as Part of a Communication Strategy. Other programmes included My Daughter, Deafness and Me for BBC One, Is Oral Sex Safe for BBC Three, Dispatches: Cash vs Cards for Channel 4.

A major debate around immigration in the UK followed the documentary The Day the Immigrants Left  presented by Evan Davis. The programme was nominated at the Rose D'Or Festival for Best Mini-series in 2010.

In 2015, Leopard Films produced the six-part series Britain's Got the Builders in for BBC Two.

The company produces a slate of art documentaries and live art performance programming including Matthew Bourne's Sleeping Beauty for BBC Two; Imagine: A Beauty is Born for BBC One, Matthew Bourne's Christmas for Channel 4; The World of Matthew Bourne which won the Czech Crystal in 2012 for Recordings of Opera, Swan Lake (Bourne) in 3D, Operetta, Musicians, Dance, ballet, Concerts Category and a Prix Italia in 2013 in the Performing Arts Category; Bussell on Ballerinas for BBC One; Death in Venice for Sky Arts 2; Bach: A Passionate Life for BBC Two which won the Czech Crystal in 2013 for Documentary Programmes dedicated to Music and Dance  Leonardo Live for Sky1 and cinematic release and Big Dance for Channel 4.

The company also produced two series of children's format Trade Your Way to the USA for CBBC.

Transparent TV
Transparent Television produces prime-time factual entertainment and documentary programming, which is run by co-founder and managing director Jazz Gowans. The company joined the Argonon group in 2012. The production company works with several major UK broadcasters, including BBC, ITV, Channel 4, Channel 5, Yesterday TV Channel, Food Network, and Liv (TV channel) to produce factual programming, documentaries, and formats, and often features with a theme of real-life stories and populist themes.

Commissioned shows include six series of access-all-areas cosmetic surgery series Botched up Bodies at Channel 5 and spin-off shows Botched Up Brides and Botched Up Abroad. A youth-skewed version has also aired on MTV. Jonathan Phang's Gourmet Trains was transmitted on Food Network in 2013, and the second series was launched in 2015. The Incredible Hulk Woman was also transmitted as part of the Extraordinary People season on Channel 5 in 2014. The Great Northern Cookbook series aired on Channel 5 in 2013 and was accompanied by a cookbook detailing the recipes featured in the show.

Transparent TV has also produced several documentaries focused on issues, including The Baby With the New Face for Channel 5, Leslie Ash: Face to Face for ITV1, 7 New Faces in 7 Days for Channel 5, and Queer as Old Folk for Channel 4.

Other productions include Restoration Roadshow and Italia Contia: Living the Dream for BBC Two, Danger: Diggers at Work for Channel 5, Mitch Winehouse's Showbiz Rant for UK Living spin-off channel LIV and I was a Jet Stewardess for Yesterday.

Remedy Productions
Founded in 2003 by Toby Dormer and Juliet Borges, Remedy Productions was one of the first production companies to join Argonon in 2011. The company was the No 1. independent producer of entertainment programming in the UK in 2014, delivering over 1000 hours of content to the major terrestrial, digital and online channels every year. Denis O'Connor is Chief Creative Officer, and Bernie Costello is the managing director.

Remedy produces content across the entertainment, music, and live event genres as well as branded and digital content, and has supplied content to Channel 4, BBC, MTV, and BSkyB. Remedy's most recent productions include Fifteen to One and Celebrity Fifteen to One for Channel 4. Other programmes include BBC Radio 1's Teen Awards for CBBC, BBC Three, and iPlayer and over 1000 hours of music programming for MTV, including The Official Top 40 and MTV News.

Remedy Canada
Remedy Canada was launched in 2012 by Toby Dormer with investment from Argonon.

The production company's first series commission was Cabin Truckers, produced for Blue Ant Media and airing on Cottage Life (TV channel) in Canada, where the programme follows the lives of those helping to transport dream homes to dream locations, against the visually stunning backdrop of Western Canada. In 2015, Remedy Canada was commissioned by Shaw Media's Slice (TV channel) to produce First Dates Canada.

In addition to producing its shows for Canadian broadcasters, Remedy acts as a partner for UK independent production companies wanting to work in Canada.

Argonon International
Argonon International is the global distribution arm of Argonon with a catalogue of over 2,000 hours of content across the genres of factual, lifestyle, formats, entertainment, drama, music, and arts.

Argonon International represents the content from across the Argonon group and some third-party content producers in markets across the world.

References

External links

Companies established in 2011
Television production companies of the United Kingdom